Scorpion is a 2007 French action drama film directed by Julien Seri.

Plot
Angelo is a former street fighter who can't deny his troubled past. Yet he has learned to channel his aggressions by striving for success in Muai Thai. But during a tournament, the officials do him wrong. After an unjustified disqualification, he cannot hide his contempt for his opponent. Although this seals the premature end of his career, the worst is still about to come, because he has made an enemy. The aforementioned opponent believes he ought to teach Angelo a lesson. He and his friends confront Angelo outside the tournament.

When three enemies attempt together to waste Angelo in a derelict, dark alley, his instincts kick in. Driven by wrath, he applies his acquired fighting skills without restraint. Thus he causes the death of one of these men. Since he seems to have fought them off with considerable ease, a court judges that this wasn't self-defense but manslaughter. Angelo is sentenced to prison.

After he has done his time, Angelo is a broken man. Nothing matters to him anymore and his alcoholism makes it worse big time. Even so, a good-hearted woman recognises a spark of decency in the debauched loser. Angelo perceives this after all and is encouraged to start over once again. But he cannot get any other job than to engage in illegal fights where gangsters bet on him. This time there is little chance of overdoing anything, because, in order to barely survive these fights, he needs everything he has got.

Cast
 Clovis Cornillac as Angelo
 Francis Renaud as Marcus
 Karole Rocher as Virginie
 Caroline Proust as Léa
 Jérôme Le Banner as Elias
 Olivier Marchal as De Boers
 Philippe Bas as Patrick

Reception
Critics assert that this film is different from most films about martial arts because it refrains from idealised, aesthetic fight choreography.

Background
Scorpion was the film debut of international martial arts champion Jérôme Le Banner.

See also
Lionheart
Fighting

References

External links
 
 
 Review on Hometheaterinfo.com

2007 films
2007 action thriller films

2007 action drama films

French action thriller films

2000s French-language films
Martial arts tournament films
Mixed martial arts films
Underground fighting films
French action drama films
Films directed by Julien Seri
2000s French films